The 2012–13 Biathlon World Cup – World Cup 5 was held in Ruhpolding, Germany, from 9 January until 13 January 2013.

Schedule of events

Medal winners

Men

Women

References 

- World Cup 5
Biathlon World Cup - World Cup 5
Biathlon World Cup - World Cup 5
2010s in Bavaria
Biathlon competitions in Germany
Sports competitions in Bavaria